"Mandrake" is the eighteenth episode of the third series of the 1960s cult British spy-fi television series The Avengers, starring Patrick Macnee and Honor Blackman. It was first broadcast by ABC on 25 January 1964. The episode was directed by Bill Bain and written by Roger Marshall.

Plot
A large number of prominent businessmen are buried in a Cornish graveyard near to a tin mine. Steed suspects foul play after a close friend meets the same fate.

Cast
 Patrick Macnee as John Steed
 Honor Blackman as Cathy Gale
 John Le Mesurier as Dr. Macombie 
 George Benson as Reverend Adrian Whyper 
 Madge Ryan as Eve Turner 
 Philip Locke as Roy Hopkins 
 Annette Andre as Judy
 Robert Morris as Steve Benson 
 Jackie Pallo as Scott Sexton

References

External links

Episode overview on The Avengers Forever! website

The Avengers (season 3) episodes
1964 British television episodes